Laurence O'Keefe (born 2 January 1965 in Newcastle upon Tyne) is an English bassist, best known as a member of Dark Star and Levitation.

Prior to joining Levitation in 1990, O'Keefe had played with several artists including The Jazz Butcher. Levitation released several EPs and single plus one album, and split in 1994. He reunited with former Levitation bandmates Christian Hayes and David Francolini in 1996 to form Dark Star, who released Twenty Twenty Sound in 1999 before splitting in 2001. He also formed The Hope Blister with Ivo Watts-Russell in 1997.

Following the demise of Dark Star, O'Keefe has continued work as a session musician and toured with the likes of Sophia, Dead Can Dance and Martina Topley-Bird.

References

External links
 

1965 births
English bass guitarists
English male guitarists
Male bass guitarists
English rock bass guitarists
Alternative rock bass guitarists
British alternative rock musicians
British indie rock musicians
British trip hop musicians
Ambient musicians
Living people
Musicians from Newcastle upon Tyne
Psychedelic rock musicians
Dark Star (band) members
Levitation (band) members
Dragons (band) members